Tubulin GTPase is an enzyme with systematic name GTP phosphohydrolase (microtubule-releasing). This enzyme catalyses the following chemical reaction

 GTP + H2O  GDP + phosphate

This enzyme participates in tubulin folding and division plane formation.

See also 
 Tubulin

References

External links 
 

EC 3.6.5